Brunswick River may refer to:
Brunswick River (Georgia), river in Georgia, USA
Brunswick River (North Carolina), river in North Carolina, USA
Brunswick River (New South Wales), river in New South Wales, Australia
Brunswick River (Western Australia), tributary of Collie River in Western Australia, Australia